"Take It Home" is the second single by Australian recording artist Johnny Ruffo. It was written by Ruffo, Michael Tan, Anthony Egizii and David Musumeci. "Take It Home" was released digitally on 19 October 2012. A second single was released on 11 January 2013 including the 7th Heaven remix.

Track listing
Digital Download
"Take It Home" – 3:09

Digital EP and CD Single
"Take It Home" – 3:09
"Take It Home" (7th Heaven Radio Edit) – 4:04
"Take It Home" (7th Heaven Club Mix) – 6:18

Charts

Certifications

References

2012 songs
2012 singles
Johnny Ruffo songs
Sony Music Australia singles
Songs written by David Musumeci
Songs written by Anthony Egizii